The Welsbach Building is a historic building in Downtown Columbus, Ohio. It was built in 1906 and listed on the National Register of Historic Places in 1984. The building served as the middle western department of the Welsbach Company, a manufacturer of gas lights, from 1907 to 1929.

The building was extensively renovated around 1997 to become a Red Roof Inn.

See also
 National Register of Historic Places listings in Columbus, Ohio

References

Buildings in downtown Columbus, Ohio
Commercial buildings completed in 1906
Commercial buildings on the National Register of Historic Places in Ohio
National Register of Historic Places in Columbus, Ohio
Hotels in Columbus, Ohio